Angela Marguerite Salem (born July 24, 1988) is an American soccer coach and former professional player who played as a midfielder. She is currently an assistant coach for the Washington Spirit of the NWSL. In 2016–17, she played for the Boston Breakers. She previously played for the Spirit, the Newcastle Jets in the Australian W-League, the Atlanta Beat and Sky Blue FC in the Women's Professional Soccer (WPS) league, Western New York Flash in the NWSL, and the Finnish club Åland United of the Naisten Liiga.

Early life and education
Born in Akron, Ohio Salem attended Copley High School in Copley, Ohio where she ended her high school career with 81 goals and 46 assists. She scored 23 goals and recorded 13 assists in her senior year alone, leading Copley to its fourth straight Suburban League title.

Salem also played club soccer for Cleveland FC and was a member of the Ohio Olympic Development Program (ODP) team.

Francis Marion University
Salem attended Francis Marion University. During her freshman year, she tied the school record by recording 11 assists. As a sophomore, Salem was ranked third in scoring on the team. The midfielder was named team MVP during her sophomore and junior years. She was a co-captain and the team's leading scorer during the 2008 season. She is the first female alumna from Francis Marion University to play professional soccer.

Springfield College
While playing professional soccer for Portland Thorns FC, Salem earned a master's in education in clinical mental health from Springfield College,  graduating in May 2020. During her masters education, she was the graduate assistant coach for three years under head coach, John Gibson, within the Springfield's women's soccer program.

Playing career

Club

Sky Blue FC (WPS) 
Salem signed with the Sky Blue FC for the 2010 WPS season. She played three games for the club. Sky Blue won the WPS Championship.

Åland United (Naisten Liiga)
In 2011 Salem played for Åland United, a Finnish club that plays in the top national women's league, the Naisten Liiga.

Atlanta Beat (WPS)
In 2011 Salem also played for the Atlanta Beat in the WPS. She started 9 of the 11 games she played.

Western New York Flash (WPSL Elite)
Salem appeared in all 16 matches for the Western New York Flash in the 2012 WPSL Elite season. She helped the team to its third consecutive championship, scoring the game-winning penalty kick after double overtime in the championship game against the Chicago Red Stars.

Newcastle Jets (W-League)
Salem played in the Australian W-League for the Newcastle Jets during the 2012–13 season.

Western New York Flash (NWSL), 2013–2014 
In 2013, Salem signed with the Western New York Flash for the inaugural season of the National Women's Soccer League (NWSL).

Return to Newcastle Jets
In September 2014 Salem joined Newcastle Jets together with fellow Americans Katherine Reynolds and Tori Huster.

Washington Spirit (NWSL), 2015 
Following the 2014 NWSL season, the Flash traded Salem and Kat Reynolds to the Washington Spirit for Jordan Angeli and a first-round pick—sixth overall—in the 2015 NWSL College Draft. That pick was later used to select Lynn Williams.

Boston Breakers (NWSL), 2016–17  
On November 19, 2015, Salem was acquired by the Boston Breakers in exchange for two second-round 2016 NWSL College Draft picks (12 & 20 respectively) from the Washington Spirit. She played for the Breakers in the 2016 and 2017 seasons.

Portland Thorns (NWSL), 2018–2021 
On January 30, 2018, the Portland Thorns selected Salem as the number fifteen pick in the dispersal draft following the Breakers' cessation of operations. She scored her first goal for the Thorns, her first goal since 2016, on June 5, 2021, against Racing Louisville FC. Salem scored her second goal for the club against rival OL Reign on August 29, 2021, at Lumen Field in Seattle.

In February 2022, Salem announced her retirement from professional soccer.

Coaching career

Washington Spirit (NWSL), 2022– 
On March 23, 2022, the Washington Spirit named Salem, who holds a United States Soccer Federation B license, as an assistant coach. After the Spirit fired head coach Kris Ward, Salem acted as de facto head coach for one game on August 27, 2022.

Honors
Portland Thorns FC
 NWSL Shield: 2021
 NWSL Challenge Cup: 2021
 NWSL Community Shield : 2020
 International Champions Cup: 2021

Individual
 NWSL Best XI: 2021

References

External links
 Western New York player profile 
 Newcastle Jets player profile
 

Living people
1987 births
Soccer players from Akron, Ohio
American women's soccer players
American women's soccer coaches
Female association football managers
Women's Professional Soccer players
Atlanta Beat (WPS) players
NJ/NY Gotham FC players
National Women's Soccer League players
Western New York Flash players
Francis Marion Patriots women's soccer players
Expatriate women's soccer players in Australia
Newcastle Jets FC (A-League Women) players
Åland United players
Kansallinen Liiga players
Expatriate women's footballers in Finland
Women's association football midfielders
Washington Spirit players
Boston Breakers players
Portland Thorns FC players
Washington Spirit non-playing staff
Washington Spirit coaches
National Women's Soccer League coaches